Slutiški is a village in Naujene Parish, Augšdaugava Municipality, in the Latgale region of Latvia. It is located on the shore of the river Daugava.

History
The village is known to have existed at least since 1785.

Old Believers
Slutišķi village is home to a community of Old Believers, whose craftsmanship has put a distinct imprint on the village architecture with its elaborate woodwork influenced by traditional Slavic aesthetics. The village contains an ethnographic museum and a rural exhibition. The entire village is considered an ethnographic monument.

References

Old Believer communities
Villages in Latvia
Augšdaugava Municipality
Latgale